The Soundcatcher is a 2007 studio album by DJ Vadim, released on BBE.

Critical reception
John Bush of AllMusic gave the album 4 stars out of 5, saying, "Moved to BBE, which is a natural fit even compared to his old label Ninja Tune, Vadim keeps a few things the same -- he still shows himself as one of the brightest and best producers in electronica." Daniel Bates of Resident Advisor gave the album a 3.5 out of 5 and said, "Many of the 17 tracks have dreamy, precise and inventive rhythms and snatches of speech, making the album sound like you're tuning between (tasteful) radio stations."

Track listing

References

External links
 

2007 albums
DJ Vadim albums
Barely Breaking Even albums